Da Crime Family is the fifth studio album by New Orleans hip-hop group, TRU, released June 1, 1999, via Priority Records and Master P's No Limit Records. It was produced by  Beats By the Pound, Ke'Noe, Meech Wells and Battlecat.  Da Crime Family debuted at #5 on the Billboard 200 and #2 on the Top R&B/Hip-Hop Albums, selling over 139,000 copies in its first week. 
Da Crime Family contains the lead single "Hoody Hooo" which made it to #11 on the Hot R&B/Hip-Hop Singles & Tracks. The other single  "Tru Homies" peaked at #6 on the Hot Rap Singles and #61 on the Hot R&B/Hip-Hop Singles & Tracks. The album was certified Gold by RIAA.

Track listing 
Da Crime Family

Charts

Weekly charts

Year-end charts

Certifications

References

This is the fifth album released by TRU on no limit records, The crime family was released June 1, 1999 & debut at # 5 on billboard 200 selling 142,000 copies in its first week.
By August 13, 1999, Da crime family had sold over 500,000 copies

1999 albums
Albums produced by Battlecat (producer)
No Limit Records albums
Priority Records albums